Queen Elizabeth Elementary School in Vancouver, British Columbia, is an elementary school. The school opened in 1940 and is named after Queen Elizabeth who visited Canada in 1939, with her husband King George VI.

It is located at 4102 West 16th Avenue, at the edge of the city limits and immediately adjacent to the University Endowment Lands. As of 2022, the current school principal is Nancy Paget.

Queen Elizabeth Elementary was one of the few schools that had an Open Area program. 
The program had Grade 6 and 7 students dedicate April and May to put on a school play which is open for the public. However the OA ended when teachers Gavin and Georgina left the school, and now there are normal grade 6 & 7 classes.

See also
Monarchy in British Columbia

External links
 Official school site

School Reports - Ministry of Education
 Class Size
 Satisfaction Survey
 School Performance
 Skills Assessment

Elementary schools in Vancouver
Educational institutions established in 1940
1940 establishments in British Columbia